The Himmelberg Hills are a linear group of hills with prominent rock outcrops,  long, at the southwest end of Saratoga Table, in the Pensacola Mountains of Antarctica. The hills were named after Glen R. Himmelberg of the Department of Geology at the University of Missouri. His laboratory research and scientific reporting with A.B. Ford (1973–91) on the petrology of Antarctica and specifically on the Dufek intrusion of the northern Pensacola Mountains was critical for the understanding of the evolution of this major igneous complex.

References

Hills of Queen Elizabeth Land
Pensacola Mountains